Cho Jin-ho or Jo Jin-ho may refer to:
 Cho Jin-ho (footballer) (1971–2017), South Korean football player
 Cho Jin-ho (baseball) (born 1975), South Korean Major League Baseball pitcher
 Jinho (Jo Jin-ho, born 1992), singer in the South Korean pop group Pentagon
 Jo Jin-ho (footballer) (born 2003), South Korean football player